Saccobolus is a genus of fungi in the Ascobolaceae family. The genus has a widespread distribution, and contains 27 species.

Species
Species include:
Saccobolus glaber

References

External links

Pezizales
Pezizales genera
Taxa named by Jean Louis Émile Boudier